Melrose Park station is a SEPTA Regional Rail station in Melrose Park, Pennsylvania. Located at the intersection of Valley Road and Mill Road, it serves the Lansdale/Doylestown, Warminster, and West Trenton lines.

Station
In June 2005, SEPTA completed a $5,336,000 project to upgrade Melrose Park station, including the installation of high-level, fully handicap accessible, platforms.

In FY 2013, Melrose Park station had a weekday average of 458 boardings and 481 alightings.

Service
The station is served by most weekday and weekend trains on the Warminster Line, limited weekday trains and all weekend trains on the West Trenton Line, and limited weekday trains and no weekend trains on the Lansdale/Doylestown Line.

Station layout
Melrose Park has two high-level side platforms.

References

External links

SEPTA – Melrose Park Station
 Valley Road entrance from Google Maps Street View

SEPTA Regional Rail stations
Former Reading Company stations
Railway stations in Montgomery County, Pennsylvania
Stations on the SEPTA Main Line